Andrey Medvedev may refer to:

Andrei Medvedev (tennis) (born 1974), Ukrainian tennis player
Andrey Medvedev (gymnast) (born 1990), Israeli artistic gymnast
Andrei Medvedev (luger) (born 1993), Russian luger
 Andrey Medvedev (mercenary) (born 1996), former platoon commander from the Russian private military company Wagner Group.